East High School is a high school formerly in the Memphis City Schools district, but now in the Shelby County Schools district in Memphis, Tennessee, serving grades 9 to 12. 
East High School is an all-optional school, with whose T-STEM programs offers opportunities to study transportation and logistics, engineering, and aviation. East High School partners with local universities to support Dual Enrollment for students to earn college credits while in high school.

History

Early years 
The current main building was designed by architect Everett D. Woods after WWII as an elementary, middle, and high school for East Memphis. Construction began in 1946 and the first classes of grades K-10 took place in 1948, with 11th and 12th grade being added in 1949 and 1950 respectively.

1975-1999 
In 1976 a separate building was built adjacent to East's rear parking lot, originally housing East VoTech. Another smaller building was built in 1984. It connects to the East VoTech building and houses facilities for the main school. 1984-1985 was also the last year for the elementary school, with the classrooms being given to the secondary and high school section.

2000s 

In March 2003 the Annex was demolished. An elevator and six ADA accessible restrooms (2 per floor) were built in its place.

A $12.8 million renovation was completed during the summer of 2007. The renovation was started in October 2005 with the renovation of the auditorium; the windows were bricked over, ADA accessibility features were added, the wooden seating was replaced with plastic ones, and a new media booth was built in the rear of the auditorium. The renovation also included drop ceilings throughout the entire school; new fluorescent lighting, HVAC, and water pipes located within the drop ceilings; and new tile flooring in the halls.

In January 2017, East High announced its T-STEM Optional Program, partnering with University of Memphis, FedEx, and AutoZone to develop a new curriculum. The decision was made due to low enrollment. The following fall, the T-STEM Academy was established, with all non-qualifying students being rezoned to other high schools. It is the first T-STEM school in SCS.

On 19 April 2021, SCS revealed their "Reimagine 901" facilities plan. The plan involves the creation of more K-8 and 6-12 schools to smoothen building transitions for students. The following spring, it was announced that Maxine Smith STEAM Academy, also known as MSSA, would be relocated to East High School. MSSA shared a building with Middle College High School at 750 East Parkway. The relocation was completed before the fall 2022 school year despite resistance.

Notable alumni
W.J. Michael (Mike) Cody, Tennessee Attorney General (1984-1988) and United States Attorney for the Western District of Tennessee (1977-1981)
Kirk Fordice, Mississippi governor (1992-2000)
Anne Haney, actress
Cybill Shepherd, actress, singer and model
Shelby Tucker, Anglo-American journalist, novelist and attorney
James Wiseman, basketball player for the Golden State Warriors, 2019 Gatorade National Basketball Player of the Year
Eric Banks, football player
Will Redmond, football player
Moneybagg Yo, rapper
Cedric Henderson, basketball player

References

External links
https://sites.google.com/a/memphiseast.com/memphis-east-high-school/

Public high schools in Tennessee
Schools in Memphis, Tennessee
1904 establishments in Tennessee
Educational institutions established in 1904